Stephen John "Steve" Balch (born 22 September 1953) is a former Australian politician. He was the Country Liberal Party member for Jingili in the Northern Territory Legislative Assembly from 1997 to 2001, when he was defeated in an attempt to transfer to Jingili's successor seat, Johnston.

|}

In 2014, Balch moved to Barossa Valley in South Australia and in 2021 he was an unsuccessful candidate for Liberal preselection for the state seat of  Schubert.

Despite his previous experience as a Northern Territory parliamentarian, Balch received only five votes out of 116 votes that were cast.

References

1953 births
Living people
Members of the Northern Territory Legislative Assembly
Country Liberal Party members of the Northern Territory Legislative Assembly
21st-century Australian politicians